Lado Akhalaia (born 1 July 2002) is a Moldovan footballer who plays as a striker for Luxembourgish club Swift Hesperange on loan from the Italian club Torino.

Career

As a youth player, Akhalaia joined the youth academy of Moldovan second tier side Dacia Buiucani. In 2019, he joined the youth academy of Inter in the Italian Serie A after trialing for the youth academies of Ukrainian club Shakhtar Donetsk and Sporting in Portugal.

In 2021, he signed for Italian Serie A team Torino. In 2022, Akhalaia was sent on loan to Virton in the Belgian second tier. On 14 January 2023, he moved on a new loan to Swift Hesperange in Luxembourg.

Personal life

He is the son of Georgia international Vladimir Akhalaia and the grandson of Moldova international and manager Alexandru Spiridon.

References

External links

 

2002 births
Living people
Moldovan footballers
Moldova youth international footballers
Torino F.C. players
R.E. Virton players
Challenger Pro League players
Association football forwards
Moldovan expatriate footballers
Expatriate footballers in Italy
Moldovan expatriate sportspeople in Italy
Expatriate footballers in Belgium
Moldovan expatriate sportspeople in Belgium
Expatriate footballers in Luxembourg
Moldovan expatriate sportspeople in Luxembourg